The Geochemical Journal is a peer-reviewed open-access scientific journal covering all aspects of geochemistry and cosmochemistry. It is published by the Geochemical Society of Japan and the editor-in-chief is Katsuhiko Suzuki.

Abstracting and indexing
The journal is abstracted and indexed in:
CAB Abstracts
Chemical Abstracts Service
Current Contents/Physical, Chemical & Earth Sciences
Science Citation Index Expanded
Scopus
According to the Journal Citation Reports, the journal has a 2020 impact factor of 1.561.

References

External links
 

Publications established in 1966
English-language journals
Geochemistry journals